The Most Deadly Game is an American television series that ran for 12 episodes from 1970 to 1971. The series was produced by Aaron Spelling Productions, with Aaron Spelling as the executive producer.  It stars Yvette Mimieux, Ralph Bellamy, and George Maharis.

The series was intended to star Inger Stevens in the Vanessa Smith role, and she did film the series pilot episode "Zig Zag," but tragically, she committed suicide shortly after filming the pilot.

Overview
The series follows the lives of three criminologists who only take on high-profile cases.

Cast
 Ralph Bellamy as Ethan Arcane
 George Maharis as Jonathon Croft
 Yvette Mimieux as Vanessa Smith

Episodes

References

External links
  
 The Most Deadly Game at The Classic TV Archive
 
 "Zig Zag" Episode Information

1970 American television series debuts
1971 American television series endings
American Broadcasting Company original programming
1970s American crime drama television series
English-language television shows
Television series by CBS Studios
Television series by Spelling Television
Television shows set in Minnesota